Manjmi is a village in the Bhagwa tehsil of Doda district in Jammu and Kashmir union territory of India. As of 2019, there is no road connectivity, electricity or health facilities.

Etymology
Manjmi word is derived from Gojri language means Central. As it is a central village in Dessa area.

About
Manjmi village is located in the hilly mountainous area of Dessa. As of 2018, it is deprived of many basic facilities for which residents protested for raising their demands. Manjmi and nearby areas possess natural beauty.

References

Villages in Doda district
Chenab Valley